Liometopum occidentale, also called the velvety tree ant, is a species of ant in the subfamily Dolichoderinae. Liometopum occidentale is often mistaken for carpenter ants (Camponotus spp.) by homeowners and pest management professionals. This mistaken identity is due to morphological and behavioral characteristics they share with carpenter ants; namely polymorphic workers, a smooth convex thoracic profile, and the tendency to excavate wood. Consequently, their importance as structural pests may be greatly under reported, especially in California, Oregon, and Washington, United States.

Taxonomy
(2009).

Habitat
Liometopum occidentale is found from sea level to over 1840 m in coastal regions from southern Washington to northern Mexico. The range of elevation of this species also appears to depend on latitude with ants collected from locations in Oregon as low as 7 m and up to 1700 m in California. They are the most common and dominant ant in oak and pine forests of southwestern U.S. They prefer to nest in the crevices of oaks, alders, elms, cottonwoods, and creosote, in soil, underneath bark of dead trees.

Colonies
After finding no aggression between workers collected from significant distances apart and no territorial boundary,  speculated that L. occidentale colonies are large and polydomous. Since they never found brood or queens, it is uncertain whether there are multiple queens within a nest, or whether each queen has some localized "sphere of exclusivity." and it just seems unlikely that there could be just one queen that produces enough eggs to establish a colony that is one kilometer wide, they also speculated that L. occidentale are polygyne. Colonies have been estimated to contain between 40,000 and 60,000 workers. Colony foundation of this species has not been studied as well as it has with the other two North American species.

Nests
Liometopum occidentale typically nest in soil, crevices of trees, and under the bark of dead trees. However, were never found by  leading to the speculation nests must lie deep under large boulders or among roots of large trees. To better understand the structure of their nests, more nests need to be excavated.

Feeding
Liometopum occidentale are opportunistic omnivores and can often be found tending hemipterans and carrying prey insects back to the nest. They readily attend hemipterans and are found in citrus groves, but their role in disrupting biological control has not been determined. Their feeding preferences need to be studied to enable the development of an effective bait for pest control purposes.

Foraging activity
Liometopum occidentale form massive foraging trails that extend 60 m or more from the nest, and can even be observed on hot days with temperatures between 24 and 38 °C.  observed L. occidentale traveling mostly underground in very shallow galleries (1–2 cm deep), or in leaf litter, however, we have also observed massive above ground trails. This means that they are only using between 33 and 68% of this area, more than twice that of L. apiculatum.

Reproduction
Nuptial flight of L. occidentale reproductives have been observed throughout May. The annual productivity for a colony (40,000 to 60,000 workers) of this species is 2 to 2.8 kg of brood per year for 4–8 years. Workers housed without a queen will also lay unfertilized eggs that are eaten or develop into males.

References

External links

Dolichoderinae
Insects described in 1895
Hymenoptera of North America
Edible insects